Tumachlar-e Altin (also Romanized as Tūmāchlar-e Āltīn) is a village in Jafarbay-ye Sharqi Rural District, Gomishan District, Torkaman County, Golestan Province, Iran. At the 2006 census, its population was 212, in 41 families.

References 

Populated places in Torkaman County